Dracontomyia footei is a species of tephritid or fruit flies in the genus Dracontomyia of the family Tephritidae.

Distribution
Ecuador, Peru.

References

Tephritinae
Insects described in 1953
Diptera of South America